Jumellea recta is a species of orchid endemic to Réunion and Mauritius.

References

recta
Orchids of Réunion
Orchids of Mauritius